Stanwardine Halt was a minor station located north of Shrewsbury on the GWR's Paddington to Birkenhead main line. It was opened in the 1930s as part of the GWR's halt construction programme, aimed at combatting growing competition from bus services. Today the route is part of the Shrewsbury to Chester line. Nothing now remains on the site.

Historical services
Express trains did not call at Stanwardine Halt, only local services. No freight or parcels traffic was handled here.

References

Neighbouring stations

External links
 Stanwardine Halt on navigable 1946 O.S. map

Disused railway stations in Shropshire
Former Great Western Railway stations
Railway stations in Great Britain opened in 1933
Railway stations in Great Britain closed in 1960